Carole McCann is a professor and Chair in Gender and Women's Studies at the University of Maryland, Baltimore County (UMBC). McCann was Director of the program from 1998-2005 and 2008-2014 when the program transitioned to be a department. For the 2017-208 school year, McCann was awarded UMBC's Lipitz Professorship.

McCann is the author of Birth Control Politics in the United States, 1916-1945 and co-editor of Feminist Theory Reader: Local and Global Perspectives along with Seung-Kyung Kim. The Feminist Theory Reader was updated with new material for a second edition, and was rereleased by Routledge in July 2009. A third edition was published in June 2013.

References 

University of Maryland, Baltimore County faculty
Year of birth missing (living people)
Living people
Place of birth missing (living people)
Women's studies academics
21st-century American women writers
American women non-fiction writers
21st-century American non-fiction writers